was a Japanese scholar and translator of American literature.

Life and career
A repatriate from Manchukuo, he graduated from Kagawa Prefectural Takamatsu High School in Takamatsu, Kagawa Prefecture, and in 1966 from Tokyo University's Literature Department, School of English Literature. After giving up his Ph.D study in 1972 at Tokyo University, he began teaching at the College of Liberal Arts of Chiba University, where he became an assistant professor in 1974, transferring a year later to Tokyo Metropolitan University, also as an assistant professor. In 1986 he became an assistant professor at The College of Liberal Arts of Tokyo University, before becoming a professor in 1992.

From 1998 he was for two years chairperson of the American Literature Society of Japan, and from 1999, also for two years, chairperson of the English Literary Society of Japan. After retiring in 2001, he was named professor emeritus of Tokyo University, and professor at Tsurumi University. In 2012 he retired. On December 14, 2013 he died from hepatocellular carcinoma.

Editor 
アメリカ文学ミレニアム ("A Millennium of American Literature"), Vol. 1-2, Nanundo, 2001

Translations 
William Inge, さようなら、ミス・ワイコフ ("Good Luck, Miss Wyckoff"), Shinchosha, 1972
Alan White, 埋葬の土曜日 ("The Long Day's Dying"; American title: "Death Finds the Day") Rippu Shobo, 1974
Van Wyck Brooks, アメリカ成年期に達す ほか ("America’s Coming-of-Age and others")『アメリカ古典文庫』研究社、1975
Wilson McCarthy, S・S特命部隊 ("The Detail"), Rippu Shobo, 1980
John Barth, キマイラ ("Chimera"), Shinchosha, 1980
MacDonald Harris『ヘミングウェイのスーツケース』新潮社 1991 のち文庫
Nathaniel Hawthorne Complete Short Stories, 1-2 Nanundo, 1994
Suki Kim, 通訳/インタープリター ("The Interpreter"), Shueisha, 2007

References

External links
 Professor Kunishige's Nathaniel Hawthorne

Academic staff of the University of Tokyo
Academic staff of Chiba University
Academic staff of Tsurumi University
Academic staff of Tokyo Metropolitan University
People of Manchukuo
1942 births
2013 deaths
Deaths from liver cancer
University of Tokyo alumni
20th-century Japanese translators